Lake Casa Blanca is a reservoir on the Chacon Creek,  northeast of downtown Laredo, Texas, United States.  The reservoir was formed in 1951 by the construction of a dam to provide recreational opportunities for the residents of Webb County. The current dam is the second built across the creek - a previous dam built in 1946 failed the following year during the initial attempted impounding of a reservoir.  There are residential properties along the lake as well as a Texas state park. Surrounding the lake is a  park that was operated jointly by the City of Laredo and Webb County before it was leased by the state in 1990 and opened in March 1991 as the Lake Casa Blanca International State Park. Lake Casa Blanca is fed by the Chacon Creek and San Ygnacio Creek.

Fish and plant life
Lake Casa Blanca has been stocked with species of fish intended to improve the utility of the reservoir for recreational fishing.  Fish present in Lake Casa Blanca include carp, hybrid striped bass, catfish, and largemouth bass.

Recreational uses
Recreational uses of the park include 
cooking out, camping, picnicking,
swimming, water skiing, boating, 
mountain biking, and the most popular recreational 
use of the lake is fishing. Boat ramps are
available throughout the lake. Lake Casa Blanca 
formerly supplied water to the Casa Blanca Golf 
Course nearby until drought conditions forced 
alternative means to be explored.

External links
Lake Casa Blanca - Texas Parks & Wildlife
Casa Blanca lake - Handbook of Texas Online 

Casa Blanca
Geography of Laredo, Texas
Protected areas of Webb County, Texas
Bodies of water of Webb County, Texas